In computer science, the predecessor problem involves maintaining a set of items to, given an element, efficiently query which element precedes or succeeds that element in an order. Data structures used to solve the problem include balanced binary search trees, van Emde Boas trees, and fusion trees. In the static predecessor problem, the set of elements does not change, but in the dynamic predecessor problem, insertions into and deletions from the set are allowed.

The predecessor problem is a simple case of the nearest neighbor problem, and data structures that solve it have applications in problems like integer sorting.

Definition 
The problem consists of maintaining a set , which contains a subset of  integers. Data structures that solve the problem support these operations:

 predecessor(x), which returns the largest element in  less than or equal to 
 successor(x), which returns the smallest element in  greater than or equal to 

In addition, data structures which solve the dynamic version of the problem also support these operations:

 insert(x), which adds  to the set 
 delete(x), which removes  from the set 

The problem is typically analyzed in a transdichotomous model of computation such as word RAM.

Data structures 

Dan Willard proposed an improvement on this space usage with the x-fast trie, which requires  space and the same query time, and the more complicated y-fast trie, which only requires  space. The dynamic problem has been solved using exponential trees with  query time, and with expected time  using hashing.

Mathematical properties 
There have been a number of papers proving lower bounds on the predecessor problem, or identifying what the running time of asymptotically optimal solutions would be. Other proofs of lower bounds include the notion of communication complexity.

For the static predecessor problem, Mihai Pătrașcu and Mikkel Thorup showed the following lower bound for the optimal search time, in the cell-probe model:

where the RAM has word length , the set contains  integers of  bits each and is represented in the RAM using  words of space, and defining .

 and the van Emde Boas tree achieves this bound.

See also 
 Integer sorting
 y-fast trie
 Fusion tree

References 

Data structures
Computational problems